The Montreal Tapes: with Gonzalo Rubalcaba and Paul Motian is a live album by the American jazz bassist Charlie Haden with pianist Gonzalo Rubalcaba and drummer Paul Motian recorded in 1989 and released on Verve Records.

Reception 
An AllMusic review by Richard S. Ginell awarded the album three stars, stating, "Rubalcaba's irresistible momentum drives this session whenever he solos; all the others can do is hang onto the whirlwind. The music-making in general, though, is more tied to the mainstream than that of the companion Montreal trio album with Geri Allen, and this group doesn't have quite the same internal compatibility as that of the Allen trio... Haden's own soloing is massive and outgoing in tone; clearly, he was hugely enjoying this festival where he was given total carte blanche".

Track listing 
All compositions by Charlie Haden except as indicated
 "Vignette" (Gary Peacock) - 11:14 
 "Bay City" - 10:44 
 "La Pasionaria" - 14:19 
 "Silence" - 7:48 
 "The Blessing" (Ornette Coleman) - 9:29 
 "Solar" (Miles Davis) - 10:23 
Recorded at the Festival de Jazz de Montreal in Canada on July 3, 1989

Personnel 
 Charlie Haden – bass
 Gonzalo Rubalcaba – piano
 Paul Motian – drums

References 

Verve Records live albums
Charlie Haden live albums
1997 albums